Central Valley High School (CVHS) is a high school for grades 9-12 located in Shasta Lake, California, United States.

Alumni
Rod Curl – PGA Tour winner
Jeremy Edwardson – record producer
Paul Howard -Pro-football player
Ashley Parker Angel -singer

References

External links 
 Official website

High schools in Shasta County, California
Public high schools in California